Fontaine-le-Bourg is a commune in the Seine-Maritime department in the Normandy region in northern France.

Geography

Heraldry

Population

Places of interest
 The church of Notre-Dame, dating from the eleventh century.
 Ruins of a 16th-century château.
 A sixteenth century manor house.
 A memorial, erected in 1958 to commemorate an early motor car journey.
 A sixteenth century fountain.
 Old watermills and cotton mills alongside the river.
 A sandstone cross from the seventeenth century.

Notable people
Motor engineer Édouard Delamare-Deboutteville (1856–1901), who, in February 1884, together with Léon Malandin, built and drove a motor car fitted with a 4 stroke internal combustion engine from here to Cailly.

See also
Communes of the Seine-Maritime department

References

External links

Communes of Seine-Maritime